Bo Althoff (born 17 September 1944) is a retired Swedish sprinter. He was part of the 4 × 400 m relay team that finished fourth at the 1962 European Championships, setting a new national record, and missing a bronze medal by 0.7 seconds. He won the national titles in the 100 m (1965), 200 m (1964 and 1966), 400 m (1964–67) and 4 × 400 m relay (1967).

References

Swedish male sprinters
1944 births
Living people
20th-century Swedish people